The 12th New York State Legislature, consisting of the New York State Senate and the New York State Assembly, met from December 11, 1788, to March 3, 1789, during the twelfth year of George Clinton's governorship, in Albany.

Background
Under the provisions of the New York Constitution of 1777, the State Senators were elected on general tickets in the senatorial districts, and were then divided into four classes. Six senators each drew lots for a term of 1, 2, 3 or 4 years and, beginning at the election in April 1778, every year six Senate seats came up for election to a four-year term. Assemblymen were elected countywide on general tickets to a one-year term, the whole assembly being renewed annually.

In March 1786, the Legislature enacted that future Legislatures meet on the first Tuesday of January of each year unless called earlier by the governor. No general meeting place was determined, leaving it to each Legislature to name the place where to reconvene, and if no place could be agreed upon, the Legislature should meet again where it adjourned.

Elections
The State election was held from April 29 to May 1, 1788. Senators Ezra L'Hommedieu (Southern D.) and Peter Van Ness (Western D.) were re-elected; and Paul Micheau, Isaac Roosevelt (both Southern D.), and Assemblyman James Clinton (Middle D.) were also elected to the Senate. Assemblyman Edward Savage (Eastern D.) may have been elected at the same time to the State Senate (Eastern D.) and to the Assembly (Washington Co.) but was seated in the Assembly; the Senate seat vacated by the expiration of  Ebenezer Russell's term remained vacant.

At the same time, delegates to a Convention to deliberate upon the adoption of the U.S. Constitution were elected. This was the first time that the politicians were divided into two opposing political parties: those who advocated the creation of a stronger federal government and the adoption of the US Constitution, as drafted, were henceforth known as Federalists, those who advocated stronger State governments and demanded many changes to the proposed Constitution as Anti-Federalists, or Democratic-Republicans.

Sessions
The Convention met from June 17 to July 26, 1788, at Poughkeepsie, and ratified the U.S. Constitution by a vote of 30 to 27.

The State Legislature met on December 11, 1788, at the Old City Hall in Albany; and adjourned on March 3, 1789.

On January 27, 1789, the Legislature divided the State of New York into six congressional districts, and the first congressional elections in New York were held on March 3 and 4, 1789.

In February and March 1789, the Legislature debated at length "An act for prescribing the times, places and manner of holding elections for Senators of the United States of America, to be chosen in this State" but the Anti-Federalist Assembly majority and the Federalist Senate majority could not agree, and they adjourned without having elected U.S. Senators. Both parties hoped to win the next State election, to be held in April 1789, and agreed to adjourn earlier than usual, leaving it to the new members to find a way out of the deadlock.

State Senate

Districts
The Southern District (9 seats) consisted of Kings, New York, Queens, Richmond, Suffolk and Westchester counties.
The Middle District (6 seats) consisted of Dutchess, Orange and Ulster counties.
The Eastern District (3 seats) consisted of Washington, Cumberland and Gloucester counties.
The Western District (6 seats) consisted of Albany, Columbia and Montgomery counties.

Note: There are now 62 counties in the State of New York. The counties which are not mentioned in this list had not yet been established, or sufficiently organized, the area being included in one or more of the abovementioned counties.

Members
The asterisk (*) denotes members of the previous Legislature who continued in office as members of this Legislature. James Clinton changed from the Assembly to the Senate. The vote of the members of this Legislature who had been delegates to the US Constitution ratifying convention is marked either "For ratification" or "Against ratification".

Employees
Clerk: Abraham B. Bancker

State Assembly

Districts
The City and County of Albany (7 seats)
Columbia County (3 seats)
Cumberland County (3 seats)
Dutchess County (7 seats)
Gloucester County (2 seats)
Kings County (2 seats)
Montgomery County) (6 seats)
The City and County of New York (9 seats)
Orange County (4 seats)
Queens County (4 seats)
Richmond County (2 seats)
Suffolk County (5 seats)
Ulster County (6 seats)
Washington County (4 seats)
Westchester County (6 seats)

Note: There are now 62 counties in the State of New York. The counties which are not mentioned in this list had not yet been established, or sufficiently organized, the area being included in one or more of the abovementioned counties.

Assemblymen
The asterisk (*) denotes members of the previous Legislature who continued as members of this Legislature. The vote of the members of this Legislature who had been delegates to the US Constitution ratifying convention is marked either "For ratification" or "Against ratification".

Employees
Clerk: John McKesson

Notes

Sources
The New York Civil List compiled by Franklin Benjamin Hough (Weed, Parsons and Co., 1858) [see pg. 108 for Senate districts; pg. 113f for senators; pg. 148f for Assembly districts; pg. 164f for assemblymen; pg. 54f for U.S. Constitution ratifying convention]
Election result Assembly, Albany Co. at project "A New Nation Votes", compiled by Phil Lampi, hosted by Tufts University Digital Library
Election result Assembly, Columbia Co. at project "A New Nation Votes"
Election result Assembly, Orange Co. at project "A New Nation Votes"
Election result Assembly, Queens Co. at project "A New Nation Votes"

1788 in New York (state)
1789 in New York (state)
012